The England women's national ice hockey team represents England in international ice hockey competitions. Since 1987, the team has participated in five games.

All-time record against other nations

References

Women's national ice hockey teams in Europe
 
Ice